The 1975 Grote Prijs Jef Scherens was the 11th edition of the Grote Prijs Jef Scherens cycle race and was held on 21 September 1975. The race started and finished in Leuven. The race was won by Freddy Maertens.

General classification

References

1975
1975 in road cycling
1975 in Belgian sport